For details on climate change in Western Asia, please see:

 Climate change in the Middle East
 Climate change in Armenia
 Climate change in Azerbaijan
 Climate change in Cyprus
 Climate change in Georgia (country)

West
Environment of Western Asia